Masat is a census town in Chanditala I CD Block in Srirampore subdivision of Hooghly district in the state of West Bengal, India.

Geography

Location

Gangadharpur, Manirampur, Masat, Jangalpara, Dudhkalmi, Nababpur, Bhagabatipur, Kumirmora and Ramanathpur form a cluster of census towns in Chanditala I CD Block.

CD Block HQ
The headquarters of Chanditala I CD Block are located at Masat.

Urbanisation
Srirampore subdivision is the most urbanized of the subdivisions in Hooghly district. 73.13% of the population in the subdivision is urban and 26.88% is rural. The subdivision has 6 municipalities and 34 census towns. The municipalities are: Uttarpara Kotrung Municipality, Konnagar Municipality, Serampore Municipality, Baidyabati Municipality, Rishra Municipality and Dankuni Municipality. Amongst the CD Blocks in the subdivision, Uttarapara Serampore (census towns shown in a separate map) had 76% urban population, Chanditala I 42%, Chanditala II 69% and Jangipara 7% (census towns shown in the map above). All places marked in the map are linked in the larger full screen map.

Gram panchayat
Villages and census towns in Masat gram panchayat are: Aushbati, Azabnagar, Banamalipur, Chhunche, Krishnanagar and Masat.

Demographics
As of the 2011 Census of India, Masat has a total population of 15,007, consisting of 9,033 males and 5,974 females. The population of children under 6 years old is 752. The total number of literate people in Masat is 6,286 (86.64% of the population over 6 years of age).

Transport

Railway and road
Baruipara railway station is the nearest railway station on the Howrah-Bardhaman chord of Kolkata Suburban Railway network. The main road is SH 15 (Ahilyabai Holkar Road). It is the main road of the town and is connected to NH 19 (old number NH 2).

Bus

Private Bus
 26 Bonhooghly - Champadanga
 26A Serampore - Aushbati
 26C Bonhooghly - Jagatballavpur

Bus Routes without Numbers
 Howrah Station - Bandar (Dhanyaghori)

Education 
 Colleges
Vidyasagar Mahavidyalaya, established in 1998, is a coeducational undergraduate college in Masat. It offers honours courses in Bengali, English, history, political science, education and commerce.

High Schools
Masat Aptap Mitra High School is a coeducational higher secondary school at Masat. It has arrangements for teaching Bengali, English, history, philosophy, political science, economics, geography, eco-geography. accountancy, business economics & mathematics, mathematics, physics, chemistry and bio-science.

 kajal patra singing school established in 2002, is coeducation singing school in masat paschimpara kalitala. It offers all type musical course.

References

Census towns in Chanditala I CD Block